Duan Siping (Bai: Duainb six-pienp), also known by his temple name as the Emperor Taizu of Dali, was a Chinese monarch and politician. He was the founding emperor of the Dali Kingdom. The Dali Kingdom would last until the Mongol conquest in 1253 led by Kublai Khan and its territories would later be ruled by the Yuan dynasty.

Biography 
The Duan family claimed descent from a Han family originating in Gansu province, although it is widely accepted that Duan Siping was a member of the Bai ethnic group. The Dian zaiji records that Duan's ancestor was from Wuwei and, having assisted the Meng clan in battle, was awarded with political rank. However, "his descendant six generations later, Siping, was born under different omens." 

Duan was a governor of Tonghai County. Yang Ganzhen, ruler of the Dayining kingdom, feared him and attempted to imprison. Duan went into hiding and gathered soldiers and horses to fight. Allegedly, Duan was eating a wild peach, when he noticed two characters written on the fruit's skin: qing xi 青昔. Duan determined that the first character, qing, referred to the twelfth month, whilst the second, xi, indicated the twenty-first day. He understood this as an omen of when he should attack Great Yining.

References

Citations

Sources 

 
 
 

893 births
944 deaths
10th-century Chinese monarchs
Dali emperors
Founding monarchs
Politicians from Yunnan